A by-election was held in the New South Wales Legislative Assembly seat of Strathfield on 12 February 2022, following the resignation of former leader of the Labor Party Jodi McKay.

The Strathfield by-election was held on the same day as by-elections for the districts of Bega, Monaro and Willoughby. The writs for election were issued on 21 January 2022. Nominations for candidates closed seven days later at noon on 27 January, with the ballot paper draw commencing in the morning of 28 January.

The NSW Electoral Commission pre-emptively sent postal ballots to all voters registered on the state electoral roll, under a regulation in a COVID amendment to the Electoral Act. Postal votes were checked against in-person voting rolls to prevent double voting. The iVote online voting system was not used at these elections after the system failed during the NSW local government elections in December 2021.

Candidates

Campaign 
One of the major issues of the campaign is the impacts of COVID-19 on business and the lives of the constituents, and the perceptions of Dominic Perrottet's handling of the virus. Other issues include challenges of overdevelopment and the number of high rise towers in the area. Li has said that in theory he is not opposed to considering Chinese investment if the right opportunity came about.

There was criticism from the chair of the Ethnic Communities' Council of NSW Peter Doukas that the voting packs that were sent out to voters was not sent out in multiple languages. Strathfield has one of the highest proportions of non-English speakers, and the fear is that this could increase the rate of informal voting.

Most of the votes were postal, counted a week later on 19 February 2022.

Results

See also
Electoral results for the district of Strathfield
List of New South Wales state by-elections

References

External links
New South Wales Electoral Commission: Strathfield State by-election

2022 elections in Australia
New South Wales state by-elections